Harristown is a civil parish and electoral division (ED) in County Kildare in Ireland, about  southwest of Kildare town.

Until 1842 the parish was part of an exclave of the barony of Upper Philipstown in King's County (now County Offaly).

In the Church of Ireland until the Irish Church Act 1869 the parish benefice was a rectory and vicarage in the diocese of Kildare, forming the corps of the prebend of Harristown in Kildare Cathedral, in the patronage of the bishop. The civil parish of Harristown contains the following 16 townlands: Bawn, Boghall, Boherbaun Lower, Boherbaun Upper or Monapheeby, Cherrymills, Clarey, Cloneybeg, Coolagh, Eskerhill, Harristown (Lower and Upper), Lenagorra, Mylerstown, Pullagh, and Rickardstown (Lower and Upper).

In 1841 Harristown civil parish was added to the existing Ballybrackan ED of the poor law union of Athy. From 1899 the ED was in Athy No.1 rural district. In elections to Kildare County Council, Harristown ED has been in local electoral areas centred on either Athy (1991 and since 2009) or Kildare (1955–1985, 1999–2004).

References

Civil parishes of County Kildare
Civil parishes of County Offaly